Ganado may refer to:

 Ganado, Arizona
 Ganado Airport
 Ganado, Texas
 Ganado High School (disambiguation)
 Ganado Independent School District, Texas
 Ganado Unified School District, Arizona
 Albert Ganado (born 1924), Maltese lawyer and historian
 Herbert Ganado (1906-1979), Maltese writer and politician
 Maria Grech Ganado (born 1943), Maltese author and academic

See also
 Ganado bravo, a term for a Spanish Fighting Bull
 Ganados, enemy characters from Resident Evil 4
 Gazini Ganados (born 1995), Filipino-Palestinian fashion model and beauty pageant titleholder
 

Spanish-language surnames
Maltese-language surnames
Surnames of Philippine origin